Monthly Magazine Home is a South Korean television series directed by Lee Chang-min and starring Jung So-min, Kim Ji-seok, Jung Gun-joo and Kim Won-hae. The series follows the story of a 'house building' romance of a man who 'buys' houses and a woman who 'lives' in houses. It was premiered on JTBC on June 16, 2021 and aired every Wednesday and Thursday at 21:00 (KST) time slot till August 5, 2021. It is also available for streaming on iQIYI.

Synopsis
It is a story about the romance of a man who 'buys' a house and a woman who 'lives' in the house. Na Young-won (Jung So-min) is an editor of the monthly living magazine 'House'. Yu Ja-seong (Kim Ji-seok) is the representative. The series tells the stories of the editors through House Magazine.

Cast

Main
 Kim Ji-seok as Yu Ja-seong
Real estate property owner and investment expert, 'a dragon from Gaecheon, Gae-ryong'.
 Jung So-min as Na Young-won
Editor of Lifestyle Magazine 'Monthly House'.

Supporting
 Jung Gun-joo as Shin Gyeom
Photographer, a gold spoon, a camping enthusiast lives in a shade tent worth 1.2 million won.
 Kim Won-hae as Choi Go, editor-in-chief of 'Monthly House'.
 Chae Jung-an as Yeo Eui-ju, 13-year editor, 'real estate down-turnist', so lives with a monthly rent of 1 million won. 
 Ahn Chang-hwan as Nam Sang-soon, a living magazine editor of 'Monthly House', who dreams of winning a housing subscription.
 Yoon Ji-on as Chang, Youtuber
 Lee Hwa-kyum as Yuk Mi-ra, a first year editor's assistant
 Ahn Hyun-ho as Gye Joo-hee, a first-year editor assistant.
 Jeong Seung-gil as Young-Won, Na Young-won's father
 Lee Jung-eun as Choi Go's wife

Special appearances
 Kim Dong-young as Na Young-won's ex-boyfriend
 Shim Yi-young as Young-won's ex-boyfriend's wife
 Lee Jung-eun as Lee Su-jeong, proof reader
 Kim So-eun as Nam Sang-soon's girlfriend called as cutie pie.
 Ha Seok-jin as model (Ep. 11)
 Park Ha-sun as model (Ep. 11)
 Lee Yi-kyung as Min-guk, freelance reporter

Production

Casting
On April 20, 2020, Jung So-min received an offer to play Na Young-won, a magazine editor of 10 years experience for magazine 'Home'. On September 22, 2020, Chae Jung-an considered to play 13-year editor of the magazine. In October 2020, the cast line up was announced. In January, 2021, the members of the 'Monthly House' were revealed by the production crew. Jung So-min and Kim Ji-suk have previously starred together in the 2013 KBS drama special You Came to Me and Became a Star, this is their second time working together. Chae Jung-an is appearing in TV series after a hiatus of 2 years. She last appeared in 2019 JTBC series Legal High.

Filming
Principal photography of the series began in the end of July 2020 and the filming ended on April 1, 2021. The photos of Jung So-min and Kim Ji-seok from filming site were released on February 23, 2021.

Release
On April 27, 2021 release date of the series with a teaser poster was announced. The series was premiered on June 16, 2021 on JTBC at 21:00 KST. Streaming will also be available on IQIYI. The rating was 9.5/10 on IQIYI as of December 17, 2021.

Original soundtrack

Part 1

Part 2

Part 3

Part 4

Part 5

Part 6

Part 7

Viewership

Notes

References

External links
  
 Monthly Magazine Home at Daum 
 Monthly Magazine Home at Naver 
 
 
 Monthly Magazine Home on iQiyi

JTBC television dramas
Korean-language television shows
2021 South Korean television series debuts
2021 South Korean television series endings
South Korean romance television series
Television series by JTBC Studios
South Korean pre-produced television series